The Soviet-made ET42 (also manufactured as NEWZ 112E) is PKP's (Polish National Railways) most powerful standard gauge electric freight locomotive. Due to its provenance, it is often referred to by its nickname of Rusek (Polish derogatory word for a native of Russia) or Czapajew (Chapayev) (Russian: Чапаев).

Description
The locomotive's construction is based on that of the Soviet VL10 and VL11 (Russian: ВЛ10 & ВЛ11, respectively) and is characterised by its straightforward design as well as ease of use and reliability. The ET42 was designed to be a dual section locomotive from the outset, as opposed to the remaining dual section locomotives operated by PKP, such as the ET41 or ET40. For this reason a "single version" of the ET42 doesn't exist; nor is it possible to modify one of the sections to run as an independent unit. Since there aren't any empty spaces left by surplus cabs, the locomotive is much shorter than other dual section locomotives built from single units. The ET42 is also equipped with facilities for heating carriages and can therefore be used  for hauling passenger trains.

Operational history
Fifty ET42s were purchased between  1978 and 1982 and were all based at the Zduńska Wola Karsznice depot. They were all built at the Novocherkassk Electric Locomotive Factory in the former Soviet town of Novocherkassk (Russian: Новочеркасск). The ET42's main role is hauling very heavy coal trains (up to 4,000 tonnes) along the routes leading from Silesia to the ports of Gdańsk and Gdynia. Four locomotives are no longer in PKP's inventory: ET42-003, ET42-033, ET42-043 and ET42-045 due to a rail accident. Now all locomotives are based in Zakład Taboru Tarnowskie Góry.

Refurbishment 
PKP announced that in 2019, all ET42 locomotives will be refurbished to better meed modern PKP standards.

See also
Polish locomotives designation

3000 V DC locomotives
Bo′Bo′+Bo′Bo′ locomotives
Polish State Railways electric locomotives
Standard gauge locomotives of Poland